The 2009–10 Wilfrid Laurier Golden Hawks women's hockey team represented Wilfrid Laurier University in the 2009-10 Canadian Interuniversity Sport women's hockey season.  The Golden Hawks were coached by Rick Osborne. Assisting Osborne was Jim Rayburn, Cindy Eadie, and Bruce Chapman. The Golden Hawks played home games at Sunlife Financial Arena. The Golden Hawks are a member of the Ontario University Athletics and attempted to win the Canadian Interuniversity Sport women's ice hockey championship.

Offseason
June 4, 2009: The end of the 2008-2009 women's hockey season saw the departures of seven of the program's players. The eight new recruits are Brittany Crago, Kristen Kilgallen, Paula LaGamba, Fiona Lester, Maureen Mommersteeg, Devon Skeats, Tori Skot and Candice Styles.
September 3:The Wilfrid Laurier University women's hockey team will participate in an exhibition game against the women's Olympic Hockey team of China. The match will be played at the Waterloo Memorial Recreation Complex on Friday, October 9 at 7:30 p.m.

Exhibition

Roster

Regular season
The Golden Hawks ranked second in the inaugural women's hockey coaches poll of the 2009-2010 season.

Standings

Schedule

Player stats

Skaters

Goaltenders

Postseason

CIS Tournament

Awards and honors
Liz Knox, OUA Leader, Save Percentage
CIS Tournament All-Star, Forward, Andrea Ironside

References

External links
Official site

Golden Hawks
Wilfrid Laurier
Wilf